Zend Server is a complete and certified PHP distribution stack originally developed by Zend Technologies intended for high performance and scalable use cases.

Zend Server includes over 80 PHP extensions and supports Apache, NGINX and IIS Web servers. It is delivered as native packages for many major Linux distributions, Windows, Mac OS X and IBM i environments including popular Cloud environments such as Amazon Web Services. Zend Server is designed to be compatible with all PHP code and provides insights into the code including the most popular PHP applications and frameworks like WordPress, Magento, Drupal, Laminas, Symfony, and Laravel.

The current version is 9.1.2 which includes a productivity and debugging tool called Z-Ray and a plugin system for extending Zend Server functionality. This system includes an online Gallery for Zend Server users to easily share, download and install additional plugins.

Zend Server is available for both Development and Production with features and a level of support that fits different use-cases.

Features
 Certified PHP Stack
 Real-time insight into apps
 Job Queue
 Data Caching
 Page Caching
 Code Tracing
 Application Monitoring
 Root-cause analysis
 Deployment and DevOps capabilities
 URL Insight
 Clustering
 Z-Ray
 Web Server Support: Apache, Nginx, IIS
 Software updates and hot fixes

External links
 Zend Server website

PHP
Web server software